Serruria furcellata, the Kraaifontein spiderhead, is a flower-bearing shrub that belongs to the genus Serruria and forms part of the fynbos. The plant is native to the Western Cape, it has always been found at Brackenfell, Kraaifontein and Kuils River.

Description
The shrub is erect and grows only 50 cm tall and bears flowers from August to October.

After a fire, the plant's roots can sprout again. Two months after flowering, the fruit falls off and ants disperse the seeds. They store the seeds in their nests. The plant is unisexual. Pollination takes place through the action of insects. The plant grows in sandy soil at altitudes of 90 - 390 m.

Conservation
This plant has previously been considered extinct. In 1985 it occurred in only two places, near Kraaifontein and close to Bottelary Heuwels, where in 1979 three plants were identified. After 1985, however, there was no sign of the plants at the two sites and it was assumed that the species became extinct. In 2004, however, two plants were discovered at North Pine, but one was soon destroyed by the municipality's bush cutting program.

However, Cape Town's Environmental Resource Management Division developed the 36-hectare Bracken Nature Reserve where native plants are preserved. Kraaifontein spiderhead specimens were transplanted after successful garden cultivation.

References

furcellata